The Midland Railway – Butterley is a heritage railway at Butterley, near Ripley in Derbyshire.

History

Overview 

The Midland Railway – Butterley lies on the Ambergate to Pye Bridge line of the old Midland Railway, a line once connecting the Derwent Valley branch of Midland Main Line to the Erewash Valley. A branch leading to the south to Ripley station was in use from 1889 until 1923. The sole historical station on the line is Butterley, which opened in 1875. The current line extends westwards from Codnor Park Junction on the Erewash Valley Line, although the present-day heritage line terminates at Hammersmith. It is operated and maintained by the Midland Railway Trust.

Use 
The Ambergate to Pye Bridge line, during its operation, was used to serve the collieries of Marehay, Hartshay, Pentrich, Swanwick and Britain Pit. The current Swanwick Junction station lies on the former site of Brand's Colliery. The line also provided rail access for the site of the Butterley Company.

The railway is also home to the  narrow gauge Golden Valley Light Railway, which opened in 1991. It partially lies on the trackbed of a former plateway built by the Butterley Company in 1813 to connect its iron works facilities in Butterley to nearby Codnor Park.

Closure and restoration 
The line was closed in 1968 and the process of restoring the line started in 1973. Much of the former track bed was razed in 1976, when the nearby section of the A38 was constructed between Ripley and Alfreton; the route of the A610 between the Ripley roundabout and Buckland Hollow lies mostly on the route of the former line. The first preservation services started operating in 1981.

Stations and attractions of the Midland Railway - Butterley

Hammersmith 
Hammersmith is the western terminus of the line; the station consists of two platforms and the secondary line is used as a run-around loop. A signal box is present at the eastern end of the station and the A38 is visible from the platform to the west.

Butterley 
Butterley is the headquarters of the Midland Railway – Butterley. The station consists of a double platform and the station building; the original brick-built buildings were demolished after the line closed. The new station building, acquired from Whitwell railway station, is made of stone and contains a shop and booking office. A café and the Alfreton Model Railway Society are also present in adjacent buildings. The signal box at Butterley was formerly situated at Ais Gill on the Settle to Carlisle line; this is the working signal box at Butterley. It is technically a ground frame; a carriage shed also stands at the eastern end of the yard, but neither the signal box or carriage shed are open to the public.In the yard is also the Garden Railway; an outdoor 16 mm scale model railway which runs on most Sundays and some Saturdays. In the yard is also the Star Tugs Trust carriage; this is owned by the Star Tugs trust and holds a permanent exhibition of some original models from TUGS - the sister show of Thomas & Friends. It is open on certain running days.

Swanwick Junction 
Swanwick Junction site holds the main complex for the Midland Railway Centre.

 Station - the station itself has 4 platforms; the station building was originally located at Syston railway station and rebuilt on Swanwick platform 2. The building contains toilets, café, waiting room and booking office. Between platforms 3 & 4 is a waiting room; this is a replica of the original station building at Broom Junction. There is currently only public access on certain events. The original building was intended to be used, but it was destroyed by vandals before recovery.
 Signal box – the operational signal box at Swanwick Junction was moved from Kettering station in 1988. There is no public access.
 Matthew Kirtley Museum – the main museum on the Swanwick site houses various locomotives, coaches and wagons.
 Historical Model Railway Society – this was opened in 2005.  It contains a large display area, study centre and small shop. Normally only open by appointment, it is sometimes open at special events.
 The West Shed – the home of the Princess Royal Class Locomotive Trust, owners of 6233 Duchess of Sutherland and 46203 Princess Margaret Rose. BR Standard Class 4 Tanks 80080 & 80098 and a small collection of classic LMS saloons, including the famous Dynamometer car, are also stationed here.
 St. Saviour's Church – moved from Westhouses, this Railwayman's church also holds occasional services.

 Derby St Mary's Gatehouse – situated at the entrance to the site, this small building was moved to Swanwick from the goods yard at Derby St Mary's. This contains Swanwick Junction Model Railway Club.
 Static Power Museum – normally open at busy periods and at special events, the building houses a good number of working machines.
 Demonstration Signal Box – recovered from Linby railway station. Now in use at Brands Crossing as a demonstration signal box, with public access.
 Linby Colliery Sidings Signal Box – currently in use as a bookshop.
 Historic Carriage and Wagon Shed – a large number of coaches and wagons await restoration here, either in the sidings or the large shed in which the Society is based.  On certain days, it is possible to see work being done inside the shed.
 National Fork Truck Heritage Centre and Road Transport Gallery – this recently completed building houses a collection of heritage buses, lorries and other forms of road transport and fork lift trucks. On certain special events, some of the vehicles are put on display out in the open
 Diesel Depot – currently housing some of the centre's diesel fleet.

Butterley Park Miniature Railway 
Operating on Sundays and Bank Holiday Mondays, miniature replicas of classic steam and diesel engines of both  and  gauge operate on a raised circuit of track. The public are permitted to ride for a small charge. Details of the stock that the miniature railway uses is shown below:

Riddings 
There is no station platform located at Riddings, but there is a run-around loop on the northern branch of Codnor Park Junction from which the line would have run northbound towards Pye Bridge Station. Just before the run around loop is the split in the track, which connects to the main line. The River Erewash runs underneath the junction.

Special events

The railway runs events, ranging from Teddy Bear's Picnic specials to Gala events; they feature standard gauge collection and the GVLR's stock:

Victorian train weekends - using railways pre-grouping and early LMS coaching stock
Easter Events
Steam and diesel locomotive events
Trains to the seaside at Swanwick Junction Station (late July-early September)
Halloween Events
Firework Night
Santa Specials (late November until Christmas Eve)

The railway is licensed to host weddings and parties.

In September 1999, the Kosovo Train for Life was loaded at Butterley station, before travelling to Kosovo, via Kensington Olympia railway station and the Channel Tunnel; this was run in conjunction with the Kosovo Force peace-keeping efforts.

From 2007 to 2019, the MR:B hosted Indietracks, a music festival that was held at the Swanwick Junction site. The COVID-19 pandemic halted events in 2020 and 2021; in November 2021, it was announced that Indietracks festival would no longer be held.

Locomotives of the Midland Railway - Butterley 

The steam engines of the Midland Railway Trust that run passenger services are mostly ex-LMS and BR locomotives of similar designs. Rarer industrial and mainline classes (such as one from as early as 1866), are stored in the Swanwick museum shed.

Steam locomotives operational or Needing Repair

Static or Dismantled

Diesel and electric locomotives

DMUs and EMU sets

Coach stock

Midland Railway vintage set
These coaches are only in use on vintage days.

Mk1 and Mk2 coaches
As with most railways, BR Mk1s are the staple passenger stock of the MRB

LMS coaches
While some other railways have an active rake of LMS coaches, most of Butterley's collection is still unrestored.

Other coaches
As with most other railways, Butterley owns several unique carriages, which are only used on very special occasions, e.g. tributes to fellow servicemen.

Matthew Kirtley Museum 
The Matthew Kirtley shed is the largest building on the Swanwick Junction site and holds all the exhibits of the museum. Below is a list of stock that can be found inside. As of March 2022 it is currently closed to the public awaiting repair of the shed roof.

Golden Valley Light Railway
The Golden Valley Light Railway is a  narrow gauge line. Laid on the trackbed of a former ironworks railway, this line runs for just under  from the Swanwick Junction site to the far end of the country park adjacent to the former site of Newlands Inn. The terminus is just above the eastern portal of the Butterley Tunnel, which forms part of the Cromford Canal. The Swanwick Terminus gained a new engine shed in 2007, which specifically houses GVLR stock.

Golden Valley Light railway stock
In addition to the standard gauge stock on the Midland Railway, The Golden Valley Light Railway, a separate organisation altogether, owns a collection of locomotives, ex colliery manriders, Ashover coach No.4 and ex industrial wagons, many of which are being restored to work on the line.

References

External links

Heritage railways in Derbyshire
Museums in Derbyshire
Railway museums in England